Franso Hariri Stadium (Kurdish: یاریگای فرانسۆ ھەریری, Yarîgay Franso Herîrî; Arabic: ملعب فرانسوا حريري) is a multi-purpose stadium in Erbil, Kurdistan Region, Iraq. It is currently used mostly for football matches by Erbil SC who plays in the Iraqi Premier League. The stadium also has facilities for athletics. The stadium has a capacity of 25,000. It was built on an old airfield in 1956 and was redeveloped in 1992. The stadium was home to the old Brusk club (renamed Al-Shurta Erbil) and was named Erbil Stadium until 2001. It was renamed the Martyr Franso Hariri Stadium in honor of the assassinated Christian governor Franso Hariri, who supported efforts to renovate the stadium.

In July 2009 Franso Hariri Stadium became Iraq national football team's home venue after the green-light from AFC to host the Iraqi national and clubs teams in Erbil.

On 23 February 2022, an all-star line-up of international football legends including Brazil's Roberto Carlos and Barcelona striker Patrick Kluivert participated in a historic exhibition match at Franso Hariri stadium against Iraqi national team stars who won the 2007 AFC Asian Cup including Noor Sabri, Mahdi Karim and Ahmed Mnajed.

Events 
 2012 – AFC Cup Final
 2019 – West Asian Football Federation Championship
 2021 – Pope Francis gave mass during his visit.

See also
List of football stadiums in Iraq
Duhok Stadium

Notes

External links
Iraq Football Association (in Arabic)

Football venues in Iraq
Football venues in Iraqi Kurdistan
Athletics (track and field) venues in Iraq
Multi-purpose stadiums in Iraq
Buildings and structures in Erbil
1956 establishments in Iraq
Sports venues completed in 1956